is a Japanese professional racing cyclist. He rode at the 2015 UCI Track Cycling World Championships. He is also a professional keirin cyclist. He also competed at the 2014 Asian Games and won a bronze medal in the team sprint.

References

External links
 

1985 births
Living people
Japanese male cyclists
Place of birth missing (living people)
Keirin cyclists
Asian Games medalists in cycling
Cyclists at the 2014 Asian Games
Medalists at the 2014 Asian Games
Asian Games silver medalists for Japan
Asian Games bronze medalists for Japan